The Representation of the People Act 1981 (c. 34) is an Act of the Parliament of the United Kingdom. It creates the provision for the automatic disqualification of an MP if they are imprisoned for over a year, leading to a by-election being held in their constituency.

The text of the Act states that it provides:Following the passage of the Recall of MPs Act 2015, sitting MPs imprisoned on shorter sentences can be removed from their seats via recall petitions.

Background
The Act was passed following the election to the Westminster Parliament of a hunger-striker, Bobby Sands, in the April 1981 Fermanagh and South Tyrone by-election, while he was serving a long term of imprisonment.

Due to the Act, following the death of Bobby Sands other prisoners on hunger strike could not stand in the second 1981 by-election in Fermanagh and South Tyrone.

See also 

 Reform Acts
 Representation of the People Act

References

External links
 Note examining the history of disqualification provisions applicable to Members of the House of Commons.

Representation of the People Acts
The Troubles (Northern Ireland)
United Kingdom Acts of Parliament 1981